is a Japanese manga artist and anime director. His wife is manga artist Ryō Ramiya.

Born 15 June 1966 in Nagaoka, Niigata Prefecture, Japan, Utatane began his career with adult works such as Countdown. His more recent works have been seinen works such as Seraphic Feather and Heaven's Prison, though he continues to release some adult works as well.

Works

Filmography
  (1995) Director, creator

Manga
  (1993)
  (1994)
  (1995)
 Countdown: Sex Bombs (2000)
  (2002)

References

External links
Art Jeuness (information site)

1966 births
Hentai creators
Japanese film directors
Living people
Manga artists from Niigata Prefecture
People from Nagaoka, Niigata